Altamuskin or Altamooskan is a small village and townland in County Tyrone, Northern Ireland. It is situated in the historic barony of Clogher and the civil parish of Errigal Keerogue and covers an area of 1165 acres. In the 2014 Census Altamuskin had a population of 127 people (54 houses). It lies within the Fermanagh and Omagh District Council area and is home to St Bridget's Altamuskin. The population of the townland declined during the 19th century:

Facilities
Altamuskin Community Hall provides sports, youthclub, playgroup and part-time post office and credit union facilities.

See also 
List of villages in Northern Ireland
List of townlands of County Tyrone

References

Villages in County Tyrone
Townlands of County Tyrone
Barony of Clogher